The AHF Asian Women's Handball Championship is a biennial continental handball competition contested by the senior women's national teams of the members of Asian Handball Federation (AHF). Since 2018, it also includes teams from Oceania. The competition also serves as a qualifying tournament for the IHF World Women's Handball Championship.

The current champion is South Korea, which won its 16th title at the 2022 tournament.

Summary

Medal table

Participating nations

See also
Asian Women's Junior Handball Championship
Asian Women's Youth Handball Championship
Asian Men's Handball Championship
Asian Men's Junior Handball Championship
Asian Men's Youth Handball Championship

Notes
1. Played in January 2000.

External links
Asian Handball Federation

 
Handball
Women's sports competitions in Asia
Recurring sporting events established in 1987
1987 establishments in Asia